Thomas Tyner (born September 14, 1994) is a former running back in American football. He played college football with the Oregon Ducks for the 2013 and 2014 seasons, and with the Oregon State Beavers in 2017. He did not play during the 2015 and 2016 seasons due to a shoulder injury.

Early life and high school career
His parents are John Tyner and Donna Tyner, Donna currently being on the Beaverton School District School Board since 2013. He has a brother, Michael, who is two years older than him and attended Pacific University. Tyner grew up in the Tyler's Green neighborhood in Aloha, Oregon. Tyner attended Hazeldale Elementary School, Mountain View Middle School, and Aloha High School. He played football as a running back and ran track. Tyner was a first-team Parade and USA Today All-American. As a sophomore, he rushed for 1,821 yards and 19 touchdowns, becoming Oregon's first sophomore to earn the state's largest division player-of-the-year accolades. As a junior, he rushed for 1,136 yards, despite missing six games. In his senior year, he rushed for a single-season state-record of 3,415 yards, eclipsing a six-year-old standard. He had 643 yards rushing with 10 touchdowns and caught six passes for 106 yards and two touchdowns in an 84–63 win over Lakeridge High School.

Regarded as a five-star recruit by Rivals.com, he was ranked 12th among all players by Scout.com and the nation's No. 2 running back behind only Derrick Green. He also participated in the 2013 U.S. Army All-American Bowl, leading the West Team in rushing with 14 yards on just four carries.

Track and field
Tyner was also an accomplished track & field athlete at Aloha High School. He established the 100-meter dash state record of 10.43 seconds as a high school sophomore. At the 2011 Aloha vs Lincoln Meet, he won both the 100-meters (10.38s) and 200 meters, recording a personal-best time of 21.41 seconds. He ran a career-best time of 10.35 seconds in the 100 meters at the 2011 Metro League Championships, placing first.

College career
Tyner was one of the most highly recruited players in the Class of 2013. He chose to attend the University of Oregon and play for the Oregon Ducks football team. In 2013, Tyner was named to the first-team true freshman All-America team by 247Sports.com. In 2014, he was a member of Oregon's team that played in the 2015 College Football Playoff National Championship game, losing to Ohio State.

On August 9, 2015, several news sources reported that Tyner would not play during the 2015 season following necessary shoulder surgery; he had injured his shoulder in 2014 playing against the Washington Huskies. On February 5, 2016, Oregon announced that Tyner had decided to medically retire from football. Tyner's father, John, revealed that the left shoulder injury Tyner suffered in 2014 was healed, but his other shoulder still had a torn labrum.

After not playing college football during 2015 and 2016, on May 20, 2017, Tyner announced that he intended to return and would play for in-state rival Oregon State. Tyner played for the Beavers during 2017 as a senior transfer, appearing in 10 of their games. In January 2018, Tyner said it was "time for me to move on", and that he would not petition the NCAA for another season of eligibility.

Statistics

Awards & honors

College
Rose Bowl Champion (2015)
Pac-12 Champion (2014)
247Sports.com First-Team Freshman All-American (2013)

High school
Oregon 6A State Champion (2010) 
U.S. Army All-American (2013)
USA Today First Team All-American (2012)
Parade All-First Team (2012)
OSAA single-season rushing leader: 3,415 yards (2012)

References

External links

 Oregon profile

1994 births
Living people
Sportspeople from Beaverton, Oregon
American football running backs
Players of American football from Oregon
Oregon Ducks football players
Oregon State Beavers football players
Place of birth missing (living people)
People from Aloha, Oregon